Khansama is an upazila of Dinajpur District in the Division of Rangpur, Bangladesh.

Geography

The upazila is bounded by Debiganj and Nilphamari sadar upazilas on the north, Chirirbandar and Dinajpur sadar upazilas on the south, Nilphamari Sadar upazila on the east, Kaharole and Birganj upazilas on the west.

Demographics
As of the 1991 Bangladesh census, Khansama has a population of 123782. Males constitute 50.85% of the population, and females 49.15%. This Upazila's eighteen up population is 60772. Khansama has an average literacy rate of 23.2% (7+ years); the national average is 32.4% literacy.
Historical Place: Aoo kora mosjid, Khansama Bridge
Entertainment place: Anondo vubon, Shisupark

According to the 2011 census, the total population is 1,78,314. Of these, males - 90,038 and females - 88,276. The population density is 956 / km2.

History
Khansama is a Persian word. Its lexical meaning - servant or servant. It is said that a wealthy merchant in this upazila (somehow the British merchant in some sense) had a very loyal servant. The servant gained immense reputation for honesty, fidelity and etiquette. In order to keep his memory memorable, this region is named after 'Khansamama'. Khansama was named as 21 January 1891. Khansama thana was created in 1891 and it was turned into an upazila in 1983.

Administration
Khansama, formed as a Thana in 1891, was converted into an upazila in 1983.

Khansama Upazila is divided into six union parishads: Alokjhari, Angarpara, Bhabki, Bherbheri, Goaldihi, and Khamarpara. The union parishads are subdivided into 57 mauzas and 57 villages.

Notable residents
 Abul Hassan Mahmood Ali, Member of Parliament for Dinajpur-4
 Alhaj Kachimuddin Sarkar
 Saiful Islam (BSC)

See also
 Upazilas of Bangladesh
 Districts of Bangladesh
 Divisions of Bangladesh

References

Upazilas of Dinajpur District, Bangladesh